Hiram Houston Merritt Jr. (January 12, 1902, Wilmington, North Carolina – January 9, 1979 in Boston, Massachusetts) was one of the pre-eminent academic neurologists of his day.  He was chair of the Neurological Institute of New York and Neurologist-in-Chief of NewYork-Presbyterian Hospital / Columbia University Medical Center in the Washington Heights neighborhood of Manhattan, New York City.

In this position from 1948 to 1967, he oversaw the training of hundreds of neurologists.  35 of his former students became chairs of academic neurology departments across the United States. He was also the dean of the Columbia University College of Physicians and Surgeons from 1958 to 1970.

His contributions to neurology were countless. Among the most important was his contribution to the discovery of the anticonvulsant properties of phenytoin (Dilantin). In 1938, people including himself and Tracy Putnam discovered phenytoin's usefulness for controlling seizures, without the sedative effects associated with phenobarbital.

According to Goodman and Gilman's Pharmacological Basis of Therapeutics:

In contrast to the earlier accidental discovery of the antiseizure properties of potassium bromide and phenobarbital, phenytoin was the product of a search among nonsedative structural relatives of phenobarbital for agents capable of suppressing electroshock convulsions in laboratory animals.

He also was the sole author of the first five editions of Merritt's Neurology; this popular textbook is in its twelfth edition (Rowland and Pedley, 2009).  His early work on the normal properties of the cerebrospinal fluid (CSF) was updated and published by one of his students, Robert Fishman, in a text that is the acknowledged standard on the topic.

Merritt was also known in his day as an expert on neurosyphilis; his 1946 monograph on the topic provided an overview of this condition, which almost disappeared from the medical eye shortly thereafter owing to the advent of penicillin.

Charles Poser, another eminent neurologist, worked under Merritt, and credited him teaching him the importance of a thorough diagnosis.

Biography
He was a son of Hiram Houston Merritt Sr. (January 6, 1870 - May 9, 1945) and Dessie Ella Cline (September 23, 1872 - January 7, 1946), who were married on January 24, 1898 in Morehead Township, Guilford County, North Carolina.

In 1968 he was sent by the Department of Health to Portugal to assist local doctors after Salazar suffered a brain haemorrhage.

Merritt died in 1979 from complications of cerebrovascular disease and normal pressure hydrocephalus; ironically, the latter condition was a syndrome whose existence he had never fully accepted during his career. His students who were treating him in New York disagreed over the proper course of action. Eventually, he was taken to the Massachusetts General Hospital, where he succumbed to the after-effects of a neurosurgical operation.

References

External links
 Columbia P&S Medical Review article by Rowland and Stefanis
Dr. Merritt's official biography (Neurological Institute of New York)
Neurological Institute of New York

1902 births
1979 deaths
Vanderbilt University alumni
Johns Hopkins University alumni
Harvard University faculty
Columbia University faculty
American neuroscientists
American neurologists
People with hydrocephalus
20th-century American physicians